Chloe Jones (1975–2005) was a pornographic actress.

Chloe Jones may also refer to:
Chloe Jones (singer) (born c. 1995), contestant on The Voice UK
Chloe Jones, a character on A Country Practice
Chloe Jones, a character on The Path
"Chloe Jones", a song by Chester French from Jacques Jams, Vol 1: Endurance

See also
Chloe Jonas, fictional character

Jones, Chloe